"Belfast" is the second single of the Euro disco band Boney M.'s 1977 album Love for Sale. "Belfast" was the first Boney M. single to feature lead vocals by Marcia Barrett and became their 4th consecutive German chart-topper. In the UK Singles Chart it peaked at No. 8. It remained a popular track in the group's live shows over the years and was re-recorded by Marcia Barrett as a solo track on her album Come Into My Life (2005).

Background and composition 
"Belfast" was written by Drafi Deutscher and originally entitled "Derry". The lyrics refer to the divided city during the height of The Troubles in Northern Ireland.

Deutscher had written the song for Marcia Barrett when she was a solo artist in the early 1970s. Due to shortage of their own material when Boney M. performed their first live gigs, Marcia Barrett performed the song which had been a popular live track for her. "Belfast" turned out to be as popular for Boney M. on stage as it had been for Barrett. The sound engineer of the group noticed the response at each gig where the song was performed. He told Frank Farian about it and Farian decided to record the track for the next Boney M. album, Love For Sale.

Farian also recorded a German version of "Belfast" with Gilla. Her version was included on the album Zieh mich aus which was released around four months earlier than Boney M.'s Love For Sale.

In the US and Canada, the song was never released and was replaced by "Daddy Cool" on the album due to the political context of the song.

The track 
The single was backed with "Plantation Boy" in all territories. In Germany, Belgium, the Netherlands, Luxembourg, France, the UK and Turkey, the singles featured the B-side fading 20 seconds earlier than the album version.

Charts

Weekly charts

Year-end charts

References

1977 singles
Boney M. songs
Songs written by Drafi Deutscher
Song recordings produced by Frank Farian
Songs about cities
Songs about The Troubles (Northern Ireland)
Hansa Records singles
1977 songs
Songs about Ireland